Giorgos Morfesis (born 22 October 1969 in Piraeus) is a Greek water polo coach currently in charge of Greece women's national water polo team.

He started his playing career in Ethnikos Piraeus at the age of 13 but due to the elite players that Ethnikos had in the 80s, Morfesis stopped his career at the age of 18 as an athlete. He won the Greek cup with Ethnikos as a coach in 2000 beating rivals Olympiacos in the final, at the age of 30 years old.

He was then assistant coach in the women's national team under coaches Moudatsios and Iosifidis before becoming a head coach with the national team.

Morfesis was the head coach of Greece women's national water polo team that won the gold medal at the 2011 World Championship which took place in Shanghai in July 2011. He has also coached Greece to three silver medals in the 2010, 2012 and 2018 European Championships and two bronze medals in the 2010 and 2012 FINA World Leagues.

See also
 List of world champions in women's water polo

References

External links
 Interview at koe.org.gr (in Greek)

1969 births
Living people
Greek water polo coaches
Greece women's national water polo team coaches
Water polo players from Piraeus